Noor Alam (5 December 1929 – 30 June 2003) was a field hockey player from Pakistan. He won gold medal in 1960 Summer Olympics and a silver medal in 1956 Summer Olympics. He was also the member of winning Pakistani team of 1958 and 1962 Asian Games.

Death
He died on 30 June 2003 in Rawalpindi and was laid to rest in Alif Shah graveyard in Cantt area of the metropolitan.

References

External links
 

1929 births
2003 deaths
Pakistani male field hockey players
Olympic field hockey players of Pakistan
Olympic gold medalists for Pakistan
Olympic silver medalists for Pakistan
Olympic medalists in field hockey
Medalists at the 1956 Summer Olympics
Medalists at the 1960 Summer Olympics
Field hockey players at the 1956 Summer Olympics
Field hockey players at the 1960 Summer Olympics
Asian Games medalists in field hockey
Field hockey players at the 1958 Asian Games
Field hockey players at the 1962 Asian Games
Asian Games gold medalists for Pakistan
Medalists at the 1962 Asian Games
Medalists at the 1958 Asian Games
20th-century Pakistani people